Vladislav Sergeyevich Soromytko (born 29 September 1994) is a Russian football goalkeeper.

Club career
He made his debut in the Russian Professional Football League for FC Smena Komsomolsk-na-Amure on 25 April 2015 in a game against FC Tom-2 Tomsk.

He made his Russian Football National League debut for FC SKA-Khabarovsk on 4 November 2018 in a game against FC Krasnodar-2.

Personal life
His older brother Ignat Soromytko is also a footballer.

References

External links
 Profile by Russian Professional Football League

1994 births
Sportspeople from Khabarovsk
Living people
Russian footballers
Association football goalkeepers
FC SKA-Khabarovsk players
FC Smena Komsomolsk-na-Amure players